Steve Johnson (born May 25, 1956) is an American football coach.  He is the head football coach at Bethel University in Arden Hills, Minnesota, a position he has held since 1989.

A native of Chicago, Johnson played college football at Bethel, starting for four seasons as a defensive lineman. He served as the head football coach at Cathedral High School in St. Cloud, Minnesota from 1982 to 1985, compiling a record of 20–17. In 1986, he was a graduate assistant at the University of Minnesota under head football coach John Gutekunst. Johnson then coached wide receivers at Montana State University, before returning to Bethel as head football coach in 1989.

Head coaching record

College

See also
 List of college football coaches with 200 wins

References

External links
 Bethel profile

1956 births
Living people
American football defensive linemen
Bethel Royals football coaches
Bethel Royals football players
Minnesota Golden Gophers football coaches
Montana State Bobcats football coaches
St. Cloud State Huskies football coaches
High school football coaches in Minnesota
St. Cloud State University alumni
Coaches of American football from Illinois
Players of American football from Chicago